Pazhavangadi  is a village in  the taluk of Ranni, Pathanamthitta district, in the state of Kerala, India.

Demographics
 India census, Pazhavangadi had a population of 21058 with 10270 males and 10788 females.

References

Villages in Pathanamthitta district